The 23rd Annual Tony Awards was broadcast by NBC television on April 20, 1969, from the Mark Hellinger Theatre in New York City. Hosts were Diahann Carroll and Alan King.

The ceremony
Presenters: Lauren Bacall, Pearl Bailey, Harry Belafonte, Richard Benjamin, Godfrey Cambridge, Betty Comden, Patty Duke, Adolph Green, Dustin Hoffman, Angela Lansbury, Jack Lemmon, Ethel Merman, Arthur Miller, Robert Morse, Zero Mostel, Paula Prentiss, Robert Preston, Vanessa Redgrave, Leslie Uggams, Gwen Verdon, Shelley Winters.

Musicals represented: 
 Zorba ("Life Is" - Lorraine Serabian and Company)
 Promises, Promises ("She Likes Basketball"/"Turkey Lurkey Time" - Jerry Orbach, Donna McKechnie and Company)
 1776 ("Momma, Look Sharp" - Scott Jarvis, William Duell, B.J. Slater)
 Hair ("Three-Five-Zero-Zero"/Let The Sun Shine In" - Company)

Scenes from plays were presented for the first time. Plays represented were:
 Lovers (Scene with Art Carney and Anna Mannahan)
 The Great White Hope (Scene with James Earl Jones and Jane Alexander)

Winners and nominees
Winners are in bold

Special awards
The National Theatre Company of Great Britain (accepted by artistic director Sir Laurence Olivier)
The Negro Ensemble Company
Rex Harrison
Leonard Bernstein
Carol Burnett

Multiple nominations and awards

These productions had multiple nominations:

8 nominations: Promises, Promises and Zorba  
6 nominations: 1776   
5 nominations: Hadrian the Seventh  
4 nominations: Canterbury Tales  
3 nominations: Does a Tiger Wear a Necktie?, The Great White Hope, Lovers, The Man in the Glass Booth and Play It Again Sam  
2 nominations: Dear World, George M!, Hair and Morning, Noon and Night    

The following productions received multiple awards.

3 wins: The Great White Hope and 1776
2 wins: Promises, Promises

References

External links
Tony Awards Official Site

Tony Awards ceremonies
1969 in theatre
1969 awards
1969 awards in the United States
1969 in New York City